Yishuv HaDa'at is an Israeli outpost in the West Bank. Located near Shilo, it falls under the jurisdiction of the Mateh Binyamin Regional Council.

It was established in 2001 by Nati Rom.

The international community considers Israeli settlements in the West Bank illegal under international law, but the Israeli government disputes this.

References

External links 
 Yishuv HaDa'at English website
 Yishuv HaDa'at 

Israeli settlements in the West Bank
Populated places established in 2001
Mateh Binyamin Regional Council
Israeli outposts
Unauthorized Israeli settlements